Jarallah Omar al-Kuhali (1942 in Kuhal, Ibb Governorate – 28 December 2002) was a Yemeni politician, intellectual, and guerrilla fighter. He was trained in Islamic law, but in the 1960s he turned towards Marxism. He was a political prisoner from 1968 to 1971 and participated in the civil war between North Yemen and South Yemen as a leader of the National Liberation Front, a politico-military coalition affiliated to the socialist government of the South. He escaped to the South after his forces were defeated by then-North Yemeni President and current unified Yemeni President Ali Abdullah Saleh. Omar became a member of the Politburo of the Yemeni Socialist Party (YSP), the ruling party in the South, and was named minister of culture in the government of a newly unified Yemen in the early 1990s. He resigned his cabinet post and went into exile shortly before a failed attempt by former southern politicians to re-establish a "Democratic Republic of Yemen" in 1994. The president of the ephemeral secessionist regime, Ali Salim al-Baidh, was a former ally of Omar in the factional disputes within the YSP in 1986. When Omar returned to the country in 1995, he developed a reputation as a leading advocate of human rights and political freedoms in the authoritarian political climate of Yemen.

Omar was assassinated in Sana'a in December 2002, receiving two shots to the chest. The assassin was 26-year-old Ali Ahmad al-Jarallah, an Islamist hardliner who sided with Saleh's government in the civil war. He was arrested immediately following the shooting and in interrogation revealed plots to kill other secular leftist (Nasserite and Baathist) leaders. He was sentenced to death on 14 September 2003.

At the time of Omar's death, he was deputy secretary-general of the YSP. He was buried in the "martyrs' cemetery" in Sana'a, on the orders of President Saleh.

References

External links
 "The Death and Life of Jarallah Omar" by Sheila Carapico, Lisa Wedeen, and Anna Wuerth (31 December 2002)
 "Yemeni politician shot dead" BBC (28 December 2002)

1942 births
2002 deaths
Assassinated activists
Yemeni socialists
Assassinated Yemeni politicians
Yemeni Marxists
Yemeni democracy activists
Deaths by firearm in Yemen
People murdered in Yemen
Yemeni Socialist Party politicians
South Yemen independence activists